"A Woman Needs Love (Just Like You Do)" is a 1981 song recorded by American  R&B vocalist and songwriter Ray Parker Jr., along with his group, Raydio. It led their 1981 album, A Woman Needs Love, the last Parker recorded with Raydio.

Background
The song was written as an antithetical answer to the earlier Raydio hit, "Jack and Jill," also written and performed by Ray Parker, Jr.  "Jack and Jill" is written from "Jack's" perspective of being neglected, just as "A Woman Needs Love" is written from "Jill's" perspective, as indicated by the lyrics, "by the time poor Jack returned up the hill, somebody else had been loving Jill."

Chart performance
The song was a hit on both the Billboard pop and soul charts in early 1981. It was Parker's first song to hit number-one on the R&B chart, and also reached number four on the Billboard Hot 100.  It is ranked as the 16th biggest U.S. hit of 1981.

Weekly charts

Year-end charts

Personnel

Raydio
Arnell Carmichael –  backing vocals
Ray Parker Jr. – lead vocals, guitars, bass

Additional personnel
Jack Ashford – tambourine
Michael Boddicker – synthesizers
Ollie E. Brown – percussion
Paul Jackson Jr. – guitars
Sylvester Rivers – piano, synthesizers
Larry Tolbert – drums

References

External links
 Lyrics of this song
[ All Music]

1981 singles
Ray Parker Jr. songs
Songs written by Ray Parker Jr.
1981 songs
Arista Records singles
Songs about infidelity